Borova or Borová (Cyrillic: Борова) may refer to:

Places

Albania
Borovë, Korçë, a settlement in the Korçë County
Borovë, a settlement in the Elbasan County

Czech Republic
Borová (Náchod District)
Borová (Svitavy District)
Borová Lada
Havlíčkova Borová, a market town

Ukraine
Borova, Kharkiv Oblast, Izium Raion, Kharkiv Oblast
Borova, Chuhuiv Raion, Kharkiv Oblast
Borova, Kyiv Oblast
Borova, a river in Ukraine

Elsewhere
Borova (Novo Goražde), a settlement in the Novo Goražde municipality, Bosnia and Herzegovina
Borova, a settlement in the Leposavić Municipality, Kosovo
Borova, Montenegro, a settlement in the Pljevlja Municipality, Montenegro
Borowo, Kartuzy County, a village in the Pomeranian Voivodeship, Poland
Borová, Trnava District, a municipality and village in the Trnava Region, Slovakia

People
Magdaléna Borová, Czech actress

See also
Borov (disambiguation)
Borovoy, a surname